Dalleth (beginning) was a support organisation for parents and families bringing up children to speak Cornish. It organised camps and other children's activities, mostly during Cornish Language related events. It also assisted in the production of books and learning materials in Cornish, including translations from other Celtic languages.

At its peak there were perhaps a dozen families involved, but as these were spread over the whole length of Cornwall regular events such as playgroups could not be effectively organised. The organisation was weakened following the introduction of Kernewek Kemmyn, as some of its more active members opted to continue with Unified Cornish. Eventually Dalleth was merged back into Kowethas an Yeth Kernewek and no longer exists as a separate organisation.

Cornish language
Organisations based in Cornwall